Elmalık can refer to:

 Elmalık, Bolu
 Elmalık, Orta